DGV may refer to:
 DGV: Danse à Grande Vitesse, a ballet by Christopher Wheeldon
 Deutsche Gesellschaft für Vorgeschichte
 Doppler global velocimetry